Major Abdul Gani ( – 11 November 1957) was a Bengali Muslim military officer, who is considered the co-founder of the East Bengal Regiment.

Early life
Gani was born in Nagais village of Brahmanpara Upazila, Comilla District, Bengal (now in Bangladesh). He studied in Comilla, and later in Calcutta, where, in 1940, he graduated from Calcutta Islamia College.

Military career
Abdul Gani joined the British Indian Army in 1941, during the Second World War. He was commissioned as a lieutenant and fought in the Burma sector. As a mark of his courage, he was nicknamed "Tiger Gani".

Following the Partition of India, he was promoted to the post of captain in 1948. He was in charge of one of the Pioneer Companies of 1st East Bengal Regiment. He retired from the Army in 1954.

Political career
Gani joined politics in 1954 and became a member of the East Pakistan Provincial Assembly as an independent candidate. During his tenure, he was instrumental in proposing the foundation of a Cadet College in East Pakistan. He played a role in the Language movement of Bangladesh.

Death
Gani died on 11 November 1957, in Frankfurt, West Germany. He had gone there as the leader of the Pakistan delegation at World Veteran Soldiers' Conference. He was buried in Mainamati Cantonment in Comilla.

References

Bengali politicians
Bengali Muslims
People from Comilla District
Pakistani politicians
Maulana Azad College alumni
University of Calcutta alumni
1910s births
1957 deaths
20th-century Bengalis